The 34th annual Cairo International Film Festival was held from November 30 to December 9, 2010.

References
     

Cairo International Film Festival
Cairo International Film Festival
Cairo International Film Festival
2010s in Cairo